Uchtenhagen is a German surname. Notable people with the surname include:

 Ambros Uchtenhagen (1928–2022), Swiss psychiatrist
 Lilian Uchtenhagen (1928–2016), Swiss economist and politician, wife of Ambros

German-language surnames